Top Channel is a national commercial television network based in Tirana, Albania. Founded by Dritan Hoxha in 2001, the network forms part of Top Media Group together with Top Albania Radio, Top Gold Radio, My Music Radio, daily newspaper Shqip, Shqip Magazine, coffee producer Lori Caffe, Digitalb, Top News, VGA Studio, musicAL, and Imperial Cinemas.

In January 2008, Top Channel was awarded national frequency coverage by making it the third such channel in Albania. In 2009, it was the first Albanian channel to become available in 16:9 widescreen high-definition television for selected programs. Since September 2003, Top Channel has been present on satellite by broadcasting all over Europe through DigitAlb, and North America through TVALB and Shqip TV. The channel is available through IPTV in Europe and North America, and through local cable in Switzerland.

History 

Top Channel began experimental broadcasts on 30 July 2001 at the International Centre for Culture (Qendra Ndërkombëtare e Kulturës) also known as "the Pyramid" or former mausoleum of Enver Hoxha in Tirana (shortly called "Piramida"). Since then it has seen a very fast growth and success as it has become preferable by a growing number of people through the qualitative level of broadcasting technology and programs.

As of 2006, it was believed that Top Channel held an average viewing rate of 70%, though these are based on approximate evaluations and not officially confirmed. In 2003, a survey ranked Top Channel as the most watched TV channel in Albania with 50% of the national audience, thus leaving far behind the second watched TV which accounted for 17%. One year earlier, it was ranked in third place with 11.9% behind the public broadcaster TVSH. Its success relates to its informational programs about the problems that Albanian society faces, as well as to the comparatively high technology by which it broadcasts.

In the past years it has also sought partnership with international development agencies such as UNDP, UNICEF, IOM, Organization for Security and Co-operation in Europe, USAID, Albanian and French Red Cross, and many others, and sustains partnership with international private companies such as Vodafone. In addition, Top Channel has seen growing partnership with international news agencies such as Reuters in exchanging news coverage.

Top Channel together with Top Albania Radio and Top Gold Radio were formed by former media mogul and Lori Caffe owner Dritan Hoxha, who later died in a car accident in downtown Tirana while driving his Ferrari. His wife, Vjollca Hoxha, has taken over the business since 2008.

Programmes 

Top Channel's programmes include a broad range of mostly pre-recorded shows, news editions, social and economic programs and entertainments (movies, sports, etc.)

Programming highlights

News bulletins and reports 
These include mainly daily news about the political, economical, cultural, and social environment in Albania. The programs also provide information regarding the main events occurring in every part of the world.

Fiks Fare 
Fiks Fare is a criticising and problem-raising show, which through humour and satire denounces the negative aspects of life such as corruption, fraud, law-breaking by high rank officials, human rights violations, country development issues and many other like problems. The popularity of this program and its simple language in addressing problematic issues of Albanian society has proven to be a significant mean of raising awareness and many times leading to solution of most evident drawbacks of the ongoing transition of the country. This program is broadcast every day of the week immediately after the main news edition. Is the version of an Italian format "Striscia la Notizia".

Shqip 
Shqip is the flagship program shown on Top Channel TV on Mondays. The one-hour live interview is the result of detailed research and investigations. The program host asks the difficult questions and gets behind the stories that make the news in the country - from political leaders to intellectuals and decision-makers facing huge challenges. Shqip reports the events and interviews on politics development, security and social issues. According to a survey conducted in 2003 by the International Research & Exchanges Board, Shqip was ranked as the most watched TV program of the same kind and thus gained some of the highest peak audience in the country. The program was presented by known journalist Rudina Xhunga. It stopped airing in September 2015.

Portokalli 
Portokalli is a weekly night sketch comedy and variety show filmed in Tirana in front of a live audience. It was first shown on 31 December 2003. The format of the show includes stand-up comedy, sketch comedy, and live music, making the show similar to NBC's Saturday Night Live. Portokalli is known to make fun of everyday problems through humour and satire. It also makes fun of political figures such as Sali Berisha, Edi Rama, Hashim Thaçi, Ramush Haradinaj and others. Portokalli reaches an audience of many ages through young and old, and has been criticised over the vulgar language often used.

See also 
DigitAlb
Communications in Albania
Dritan Hoxha
Radio Televizioni Shqiptar

References

External links 
 

Television networks in Albania
Television channels and stations established in 2001
Mass media in Tirana